The 2020 Michigan's 34th House of Representatives district special election was held on March 10, 2020. Democratic nominee Cynthia Neeley defeated Republican nominee Adam Ford with 91.9% of the vote.

Background
On November 11, 2019, State Representative Sheldon Neeley was sworn in as the 94th mayor of Flint. On the same day, he resigned from his seat from the legislature. The March 10, 2020 special election was held to fill the vacancy his resignation left.

Democratic primary

Candidates
Cynthia Neeley
Sean Croudy
Santino Guerra
Charis Lee
Claudia Milton
Michael Clack
Monica Galloway
Candice Mushatt
Sherwood Pea Jr.
Vincent Lang

Results

Republican primary

Candidates
Adam Ford ran unopposed in the Republican primary.

General Election

References

House 34
Michigan House 34
2020 34